Prasophyllum olidum, commonly known as the pungent leek orchid is a species of orchid endemic to Tasmania. It has a single tubular, green to yellowish-green leaf and up to thirty bright green to brownish-green flowers. It is a very rare orchid, only found in a single location with a population which fluctuates from three to two hundred flowering plants.

Description
As with other leek orchids, the flowers are inverted so that the labellum is above the column rather than below it. The edges of the upturned part of the labellum are slightly wavy and there is a thick, fleshy green callus in its centre. Flowering occurs in late November and December.

Taxonomy and naming
Prasophyllum olidum was first formally described in 1998 by David Jones from a specimen collected near Campbell Town and the description was published in Australian Orchid Research. The specific epithet (olidum) is a Latin word meaning "smelling" or "odorous".

Distribution and habitat

Conservation
Prasophyllum olidum is only known from a small area of a single private property. The population varies depending on rainfall. In 1995 the population was estimated to be about 200 but in 2011, following below average winter rains, the population was only three. It is classed as "Endangered" under the Tasmanian Threatened Species Protection Act 1995 and as Critically Endangered under the Commonwealth Government Environment Protection and Biodiversity Conservation Act 1999 (EPBC) Act. The main threats to the population are habitat disturbance and inappropriate fire regimes.

References

External links 
 

olidum
Flora of Tasmania
Endemic orchids of Australia
Plants described in 1998